This is a list of notable Japanese photographers in alphabetical order by last name. Names on this list are presented in Western name order, with given name first and family name second.

A-C 

 Tadasuke Akiyama
 Takashi Amano
 Nobuyoshi Araki
 Taku Aramasa
 Taiji Arita
 Masanori Ashida
 Ōno Benkichi
 Teisuke Chiba
 Yasuyoshi Chiba

D-F 

 Ken Domon
 Ei-Q
 T. Enami
 Hakuyō Fuchikami
 Atsushi Fujiwara
 Mitsutarō Fuku
 Katsuji Fukuda
 Rosō Fukuhara
 Shinzō Fukuhara
 Narutoshi Furukawa

G-J 

 Masao Gozu
 Kanbei Hanaya
 Hisaji Hara
 Mikiko Hara
 Fuyuki Hattori
 Osamu Hayasaki
 Tadahiko Hayashi
 Takanobu Hayashi
 Terushichi Hirai
 Horie Kuwajirō
 Masao Horino
 Tetsuya Ichimura
 Seiryū Inoue
 Taikichi Irie
 Ryuichi Ishikawa
 Kei Ito
 Yoshihiko Itō
 Mitsuaki Iwagō
 Takeji Iwamiya
 Bishin Jumonji

K  

 Tokujirō Kameya
 Mari Katayama
 Rinko Kawauchi
 Seiki Kayamori
 Kensuke Kazama
 Takashi Kijima
 Hiroh Kikai
 Shunkichi Kikuchi
 Ihei Kimura
 Genzō Kitazumi
 Meison Kobayashi
 Shinichiro Kobayashi
 Fusako Kodama
 Naonori Kohira
 Kiyoshi Koishi
 Ryūa Kojima
 Akira Komoto
 Tomio Kondō
 Asahachi Kōno
 Motoichi Kumagai
 Seiji Kurata
 Kusakabe Kimbei
 Kineo Kuwabara
 Shisei Kuwabara

M-O 

 Genzō Maeda
 Shinzo Maeda
 Susumu Matsushima
 Minoru Minami
 Tōyō Miyatake
 Yūhi Miyazaki
 Aizō Morikawa
 Daidō Moriyama
 Shigeichi Nagano
 Yasushi Nagao
 Katsu Naito
 Ikkō Narahara
 Yōnosuke Natori
 Kiyoshi Nishiyama
 Tohru Nogami
 Kazumasa Ogawa
 Seiyo Ogawa
 Yoshino Ōishi
 Kosuke Okahara
 Takashi Okamura
 Kōshirō Onchi
 Mitsugu Ōnishi
 Chizu Ono
 Kei Orihara

S 

 Akira Satō
 Kōji Satō
 Tokihiro Satō
 Masato Seto
 Noriyoshi Shibata
 Bukō Shimizu
 Tōkoku Shimizu
 Kishin Shinoyama
 Mieko Shiomi
 Issei Suda
 Hiroshi Sugimoto
 Yoshiyasu Suzuka

T 

 Minayoshi Takada
 Kaietsu Takagi
 Tadashi Takamura
 Yutaka Takanashi
 Masataka Takayama
 Kenzō Tamoto
 Kozaburō Tamamura
 Akihide Tamura
 Sakae Tamura
 Sakae Tamura
 Shigeru Tamura
 Kōtarō Tanaka
 Manji Terashima
 Toyoko Tokiwa
 Shōmei Tōmatsu
 Rihei Tomishige
 Akira Toriyama
 Akito Tsuda

U-Y 

 Kuichi Uchida
 Shōji Ueda
 Noboru Ueki
 Hikoma Ueno
 Gyokusen Ukai
 Kaoru Usui
 Ōri Umesaka
 Hiroshi Watanabe
 Hitomi Watanabe
 Kansuke Yamamoto
 Hiroshi Yamazaki
 Nakaji Yasui
 Matsusaburō Yokoyama
 Tomizo Yoshikawa
 Kohei Yoshiyuki

See also 
 List of Japanese artists
 List of Japanese women photographers
 History of photography in Japan

Photography in Japan
Japanese
Photographers